The Giant is a 2016 Danish-Swedish drama film directed by Johannes Nyholm. It was selected to be screened in the Discovery section at the 2016 Toronto International Film Festival. At the 52nd Guldbagge Awards the film won three Guldbagge Awards, Best Film, Best Screenplay and Makeup and Hair.

Plot summary

Cast
 Christian Andrén as Rikard
 Johan Kylén as Roland
 Anna Bjelkerud as Elisabeth
 Linda Faith as Lina

References

External links
 
 

2016 films
2016 drama films
2010s sports drama films
Danish sports drama films
Swedish sports drama films
2010s Swedish-language films
2016 directorial debut films
Boules films
Best Film Guldbagge Award winners
Best Screenplay Guldbagge Award winners
2010s Swedish films